Sigurður Breiðfjörð (4 March 1798 – 1846) was an Icelandic poet. He learned cooperage for four years in Copenhagen and worked as a cooper in Iceland and Greenland. He was a prolific and popular traditional poet, known for his rímur cycles. Núma rímur is his best-known work.

References

 Neijmann, Daisy L. (1996). The Icelandic Voice in Canadian Letters : The Contribution of Icelandic-Canadian Writers to Canadian Literature. McGill-Queen's Press. 
 Sigurður Breiðfjörð 
 Sigurður Breiðfjörð  in Dansk Forfatterleksikon (in Danish)

Sigurdur Breidfjord
1798 births
1846 deaths
Sigurdur Breidfjord
Sigurdur Breidfjord